Ronald Alexander Kee (born 4 November 1938) is a former Australian rules footballer who played with St Kilda in the Victorian Football League (VFL).

Notes

External links 

Ron Kee's playing statistics from The VFA Project

Living people
1938 births
Australian rules footballers from Victoria (Australia)
St Kilda Football Club players
Leongatha Football Club players